Mimma Chernovita (born 11 November 1974) is an Indonesian former professional tennis player.

Chernovita had a career high singles ranking of 435 in the world while competing on the professional tour. She featured in the main draw of WTA Tour tournaments in Jakarta and Surabaya during her career.

At the 1995 Southeast Asian Games in Chiang Mai, Chernovita won three medals for Indonesia, including a gold in the team event.
 
In 1997 she represented the Indonesia Fed Cup team in a total of four ties. She lost her only singles rubber, to Wang Shi-ting, but won two of her three doubles rubbers, both partnering Eny Sulistyowati.

ITF finals

Doubles: 3 (1–2)

References

External links
 
 
 

1974 births
Living people
Indonesian female tennis players
Competitors at the 1995 Southeast Asian Games
Southeast Asian Games medalists in tennis
Southeast Asian Games gold medalists for Indonesia
Southeast Asian Games bronze medalists for Indonesia
20th-century Indonesian women